An alluvial plain is a largely flat landform created by the deposition of sediment over a long period of time by one or more rivers coming from highland regions, from which alluvial soil forms. A floodplain is part of the process, being the smaller area over which the rivers flood at a particular period of time, whereas the alluvial plain is the larger area representing the region over which the floodplains have shifted over geological time.

As the highlands erode due to weathering and water flow, the sediment from the hills is transported to the lower plain. Various creeks will carry the water further to a river, lake, bay, or ocean. As the sediments are deposited during flood conditions in the floodplain of a creek, the elevation of the floodplain will be raised. As this reduces the channel floodwater capacity, the creek will, over time, seek new, lower paths, forming a meander (a curving sinuous path). The leftover higher locations, typically natural levees at the margins of the flood channel, will themselves be eroded by lateral stream erosion and from local rainfall and possibly wind transport if the climate is arid and does not support soil-holding grasses. These processes, over geologic time, will form the plain, a region with little relief (local changes in elevation), yet with a constant but small slope.

The Glossary of Landform and Geologic Terms, maintained by the United States' National Cooperative Soil Survey (NCSS), defines an "alluvial plain" as "a large assemblage of fluvial landforms (braided streams, terraces, etc.,) that form low gradient, regional ramps along the flanks of mountains and extend great distances from their sources (e.g., High Plains of North America)"  Use of "alluvial plain" as a general, informal term for a broad flood plain or a low-gradient delta is explicitly discouraged.  The NCSS glossary instead suggests "flood plain".

Alluvial plains have similar traits to a River delta, however the river delta will flow into a larger body of water. Alluvial plains generally lack this.

Examples
 Baetic Depression in Andalusia, Spain
 Canterbury Plains, Southland Plains, and Waikato Plains in New Zealand
 Chianan Plain in Taiwan
 Lower Danubian Plain, Bulgaria and Romania
 Indo-Gangetic Plain and Punjab in India, Pakistan, and Bangladesh
 Iskar (river) valleys in Bulgaria
 Mekong Delta in Vietnam
 Mesaoria in Cyprus
 Mesopotamia in Iraq 
 Mississippi Alluvial Plain, Oxnard Plain, and Laguna de Santa Rosa in the United States
 Multiple sites in Switzerland
 North China Plain in China
 Palakaria Valley in Bulgaria
 Po Valley in Italy
 Rhine–Meuse–Scheldt in the Netherlands
 Santa Clara Valley in San Jose, California
 Struma Valley in Bulgaria
 Tempisque River plain in Costa Rica
 Tundzha valleys in Bulgaria
 Upper Thracian Plain in Bulgaria

See also 
 Alluvial fan
 Alluvium
 Coastal plain
 Desert pavement
 River delta

References

Fluvial landforms
+
Geography terminology